Charles Meigh Perkins (10 May 1854 – 26 April 1912) was an English cricketer.  Perkins was a right-handed batsman.  He was born at Sowe, Warwickshire.

Perkins made a single first-class appearance for Sussex in 1884 against Nottinghamshire at Trent Bridge. Nottinghamshire won the toss and elected to bat first, making 271 all out. Sussex were then dismissed for just 76 in their first-innings, with Perkins scoring 11 runs before he was dismissed by Alfred Shaw. Forced to follow-on against one of the strongest bowling attacks of the day, Sussex were dismissed for just 44, with Perkins ending the innings not out on a single run. Nottinghamshire won the match by an innings and 151 runs. This was his only major appearance for Sussex.

He died at Hove, Sussex, on 26 April 1912.

References

External links
Charles Perkins at ESPNcricinfo
Charles Perkins at CricketArchive

1854 births
1912 deaths
Cricketers from Coventry
English cricketers
Sussex cricketers